The Slovak National Council's Declaration of Independence of the Slovak Nation was a resolution of the Slovak National Council on 17 July 1992, by which members of the Council demanded Slovakia's independence although it was not a Unilateral Declaration of Independence. This event was part of a process, which finished with the dissolution of Czechoslovakia and creation of an independent Slovakia on 1 January 1993.

The text of the declaration in Slovak:

English translation:

References

Political history of Slovakia
Declarations of independence
1992 documents
1992 in Czechoslovakia
1992 in Slovakia
July 1992 events in Europe